These are the official results of the women's 1,500m metres event at the 1980 Summer Olympics in Moscow, Russian SFSR, Soviet Union. There were a total number of 26 participating athletes, with the final was held on Friday 1980-08-01.

Final

Semi-finals
Held on Wednesday 1980-07-30

See also
 1976 Women's Olympic 1,500 metres (Montreal)
 1978 Women's European Championships 1,500 metres (Prague)
 1982 Women's European Championships 1,500 metres (Athens)
 1983 Women's World Championships 1,500 metres (Helsinki)
 1984 Women's Olympic 1,500 metres (Los Angeles)

References

External links
 
 Results

 1
1500 metres at the Olympics
1980 in women's athletics
Women's events at the 1980 Summer Olympics